The fireman's rule (firefighter's rule) is a common law or statutory restriction on tort actions by public safety officials. In general, the fireman's rule bars lawsuits by firefighters, police officers and, in some jurisdictions, all government safety professionals from collecting on damages that occur in the course of their duties even in cases of clear negligence by other parties.

Rationale
At the most basic, the fireman's rule is based on the principle that public safety officers willingly assume the risks inherent in their duties. Since the very purpose of public safety officers is to confront danger, the public is not liable for injuries incurred while carrying out that function. While the rule is named after the risks and actions by firemen, the relationship between danger and duties is similar in all public safety officers, and other professional rescuers.

Criticism
The fireman's rule has been heavily criticized for preventing police officers from suing criminals who intentionally lead them on high-speed car chases.  In response to one such case, the California State Legislature enacted California Civil Code Section 1714.9 in 1982, which overrides the fireman's rule where the tortious conduct occurred after the defendant knew or should have known of the plaintiff's presence.  In Minnesota peace officers are exempted from the fireman's rule by statute.§ M.S. 604.06

In certain states, such as Pennsylvania, the courts have not always applied the fireman's rule. In 1995, the Pennsylvania Superior Court ruled that in regards to landowners, firefighters are viewed as "licensees," and are therefore owed the same duty of care that any citizen who is permitted to be on the property would receive. In earlier decisions, such as 1988's Mull v. Kerstetter, in which a volunteer firefighter was injured after falling into an unmarked and unprotected window well, the court ruled that a police officer entering land in his or her official capacity and in response to a call for assistance is generally considered a licensee. Therefore, the landowner is responsible for warning the licensee of any dangerous hidden conditions on the premises.

See also
Baseball Rule, similar tort exception for foul-ball injuries to spectators at baseball games
Rescue doctrine

References

Common law rules
Tort law